Khor Fakkan Club (formally known as Al Khaleej), usually known simply as Khor Fakkan, is an Emirati football club from Khor Fakkan.

History
Founded in 1981, the club won a UAE Federation Cup in the 1993–94 season. In June 2017 the club was rebranded with a new name and logo now it is known as Khor Fakkan. The team were promoted back to the top flight in 2019 after winning the UAE Division 1, it was their first experience in the UAE Pro League since 2008.

Current squad
As of UAE Pro-League:

Unregistered players

Honours
The club has gained the following honours:

 UAE Federation Cup: 1
 Winners: 1993–94

 UAE Division One: 6
 Winners: 1978–79, 1981–82, 1993-94, 2000-01, 2007-08, 2018–19

 UAE President Cup:
 Runners-up: 1986–87

Notable players 
  Mubarak Ghanim
  Khalil Ghanim
  Abdullah Ali Sultan
  Temurkhuja Abdukholiqov
  Osama Rashid

Club staff

Pro-League record

Notes 2019–20 UAE football season was cancelled due to the COVID-19 pandemic in the United Arab Emirates.

Key
 Pos. = Position
 Tms. = Number of teams
 Lvl. = League

Futsal team
UAE PRESIDENT CUP - FUTSAL:  1
Winners:  2012–2013
UAE FUTSAL LEAGUE:  1
Winners:  2013–2014
UAE Federation Cup:  1
Winners:  2013–2014
UAE FUTSAL SUPER CUP:  1
Winners:  2014–2015
UAE YOUTH FUTSAL CUP:  1
Winners:  2018.

References

External links
Soccerway team profile

Khor Fakkan
Association football clubs established in 1981
1981 establishments in the United Arab Emirates
Sport in the Emirate of Sharjah